A neutral sixth is a musical interval wider than a minor sixth  but narrower than a major sixth .  Three distinct intervals may be termed neutral sixths:

 The undecimal neutral sixth has a ratio of 18:11 between the frequencies of the two tones, or about 852.59 cents. 
 A tridecimal neutral sixth has a ratio of 13:8 between the frequencies of the two tones, or about 840.53 cents.  This is the smallest neutral sixth, and occurs infrequently in music, as little music utilizes the 13th harmonic. 
 An equal-tempered neutral sixth is 850 cents, a hair narrower than the 18:11 ratio. It is an equal-tempered quarter tone exactly halfway between the equal-tempered minor and major sixths, and half of an equal-tempered perfect eleventh (octave plus fourth). 

These intervals are all within about 12 cents of each other and are difficult for most people to distinguish.  Neutral sixths are roughly a quarter tone sharp from 12 equal temperament (12-ET) minor sixths and a quarter tone flat from 12-ET major sixths.  In just intonation, as well as in tunings such as 31-ET, 41-ET, or 72-ET, which more closely approximate just intonation, the intervals are closer together.

A neutral sixth can be formed by subtracting a neutral second from a minor seventh.  Based on its positioning in the harmonic series, the undecimal neutral sixth implies a root one minor seventh above the higher of the two notes.

Thirteenth harmonic

The pitch ratio 13:8 (840.53 cents) is the ratio of the thirteenth harmonic and is notated in Ben Johnston's system as A13. In 24-ET is approximated by A. This note is often corrected to a just or Pythagorean ratio on the natural horn, but the pure thirteenth harmonic was used in pieces including Britten's Serenade for tenor, horn and strings.

See also
  List of musical intervals
 List of pitch intervals
 Microtonal music

References

Neutral intervals
Sixths (music)
Quarter tones